Mike Rotkin is a lecturer at the University of California, Santa Cruz, long-term city council member, and an ex-mayor of Santa Cruz, California. source: https://scmtd.com/en/fares/38-agency-info/administration/board-of-directors/103-bod-bio-mike-rotkin

A former motorcycle mechanic with a Ph.D. in the History of Consciousness, Mike first ran for city council on a protest campaign as a "socialist-feminist" in 1979, taking first place among voters at a time when Santa Cruz was more Republican than Democrat. He taught Marxist theory at UC Santa Cruz for over 40 years, while serving six terms as a city councilman, including five terms as the mayor, longer than anyone in the city's history (the mayoral post of Santa Cruz passes yearly to a councilmember selected by a majority of other councilmembers). During his 20 years in city government, city spending on social services and programs increased from $80,000 ($200,000; 2000US) a year in 1979 to $2 million by 2000. However, in the 2006 election, he was criticized for supporting pragmatic pro-economic development positions.

He served as president of the University of California, Santa Cruz (UCSC) teachers' union.

References

American Marxists
Santa Cruz, California
University of California, Santa Cruz alumni
University of California, Santa Cruz faculty
Mayors of Santa Cruz, California
Living people
Year of birth missing (living people)
American socialist feminists